Fabio Valsesia (born April 26, 1981, in Borgomanero) is an Italian former soccer player. He made 20 appearances in the Italian professional leagues, including playing in Serie B for Monza. He represented Italy at under-16 level.

References

1981 births
Living people
Association football forwards
Italian footballers
Italy youth international footballers
Serie B players
A.C. Monza players
F.C. Pro Vercelli 1892 players
People from Borgomanero